The Jacaré-Guaçu River is a river of São Paulo state in southeastern Brazil. It flows into the Tietê River near Ibitinga.

The river separates the municipalities of Brotas and São Carlos.
The Santana Dam creates a reservoir on the river covering .
The Mata do Jacaré Ecological Station lies along the south shore of the reservoir.

See also
List of rivers of São Paulo

References

Brazilian Ministry of Transport

Rivers of São Paulo (state)
Tributaries of the Tietê